Jarrow Vikings are a rugby league team based in Jarrow, Tyne and Wear. They play in the North East Premier division of the Rugby League Conference.

History
A great deal of schools development had taken place in 2003-04 in primary schools in Jarrow and Hebburn and George Taylor decided to establish a club based out of Luke's Lane. Following some consultation with the local rugby union side, Jarrovians, Jarrow Junior Vikings became active at the under-12 age group.

Soon after there was enough interest to form an adult section with a number of players coming forward from Westoe RFC and Student Rugby League set-ups in the North East the side were soon training and joined the North East Division of the Rugby League Conference for 2004. The club's reputation soon grew and their interaction in the wider community earned them the National title as Best New Club for 2004, for which they received an award from the Rugby Football League.

In 2005, the Conference developed a new tier of Premier Divisions and Jarrow Vikings stepped up to the newly created North Premier Division. In 2006, they played in the North Division and a further 2007 reshuffle of the regional divisions saw Jarrow rejoin the North East Division.

Jarrow won their first silverware in 2009 when they took the North East Division title. They beat Scottish champions Edinburgh Eagles and made it to the Regional Grand Final but were beaten by Northampton Casuals.

Jarrow joined the newly formed North East Premier in 2011.

Juniors
Jarrow's junior teams take part in the North East Junior League.

Club honours
 RLC North East Division winners: 2009, 2010, Premier League winners 2011, 2012, 2014, 2016
North East Cup winners: 2012, 2015

External links
 Official website

Rugby League Conference teams
Rugby league teams in Tyne and Wear
Jarrow
Rugby clubs established in 2003